Dhananjay Bhattacharya (September 10, 1922 – December 27, 1992) was an Indian Bengali singer and composer. He was a versatile Shyama Sangeet singer.

Career 
He started his career by singing modern Bengali as well as Hindi songs. His first song was "Jodi bhule jao more/janabo na abhiman..." in 1940, recorded with Pioneer Company. His first playback was in 1943. He was best known for singing Shyama Sangeet. Out of the 24 songs in the movie Sadhak Ramprasad (1956), Dhananjay sang 23. He was versatile in singing major types and forms of songs including modern Bengali, Hindustani classical music, Rabindra Sangeet, Kirtan, Bhajan, Baul, Ramprasadi (of Ramprasad Sen), Nazrul Geeti, and Shyama Sangeet. His singing career lasted more than fifty years. There are 500 records of his songs. He was also a lyricist and wrote about 400 songs in the name of "Shri Partha" and "Shri Ananda".

He acted in a few films, including "Nababidhan and Pasher Bari. In the latter, his song "Jhir Jhir Jhir Jhirjhiri Baroshay" composed by Salil Chowdhury became an instant hit. "Matite Janmo Nilam", "Ei Jhir Jhir Jhir Batase", and "Jhanana Jhanana Baje" were other major hits which are still popular.

Dhanajay won the Gold Prize for his devotional songs in Rani Rasmoni. Among his basic records, one Raag based composition by Salil Chowdhuri released as a Saradiya number was such a hit that it kept on selling during the next Puja as well.

One of his best kept secrets was that he was also a prolific lyricist, all written under different pseudonyms. Many hit numbers of Pannalal Bhattacharya in particular were penned by him, as well as musical compositions.

Personal life 
Dhananjay was married and had three sons. Out of them, only Dipankar has taken the onus upon him to carry the legacy of his father.

He was the older brother of the singer Pannalal. He studied in Rivers Thompson School, Bally, Howrah.

Some people say that he and Pannalal both wanted to please Kali by offering her their songs. According to them Dhananjay received the grace of the divine mother, but Pannalal didn't, and so he committed suicide, and after his death, Dhananjay bore the responsibility of Pannalal's family, along with his own.

Selected career

As playback singer 
 Abire Rangano
 Adrysha Manush
 Adya Shakti Mahamaya
 Aleya
 Ardhangini (1955)
 Asampta
 Balak Gadadhar
 Babla

 Badshah (1963)
 Bandhan (1962)
 Banka Lekha
 Bardidi
 Behula Lakshindar
Bhagwan Sriramakrishna
Bhagwan Sri Krishna Chaitanya
Bhadurai Masaya

 Bireswar Vivekanada
Biraj Bou
 Chaitali
 Chalachal
 Chandranath
 Debitirtha-Kamrup (1967)
 Debtirtha Kalighat
 Dhooli (1954)
 Godhuli (1955)
 Jai Ma Tara (1978)
 Kalo
 Mahaprasthaner Pathey (1952)
 Maharaj Krisnachandra
 'Mirabai
 Mejdidi (1950)

 Naba Bidhan (1954)
Nader Nimay
 Nastanir
Paper Pathey
Rani Rashmoni (1955)
 Rupasi (1980)
 Sachimatar Sansar

 Sadhak Banakhyapa
 Sadhak Ramprasad (1956)
 Sahar Theheke Durye
 Saheb Bibi Golam
 Sati Kankabati
 Shreebatsa Chinta (1955)
 Swamiji
 Tamasha
 Tansen (1958)
 Yata Mat Tata Mat
 Yatrik (1952)

As actor 
 Naba Bidhan (1954) as Abinash
 Pasher Bari
 Sharey Chuattor (1953)
 Shoshur Bari

As music director in films 
 Joy Ma Tara (1978)
 Ladies Seat

References

External links 
 https://archive.today/20130208182732/http://shibpurinternational.com/sublink/Personalities/html/Dhananjay%20Bhattacharya.html
 http://www.hummaa.com/music/artist/Dhananjay+Bhattacharya/732
 http://www.raaga.com/channels/bengali/singers/Dhananjay_Bhattacharya.html

1922 births
Bengali singers
1992 deaths
20th-century Indian singers
Singers from West Bengal
20th-century Indian male singers